Avognan Nogboun (born 1954) is an Ivorian sprinter. He competed in the men's 400 metres at the 1976 Summer Olympics.

References

1954 births
Living people
Athletes (track and field) at the 1976 Summer Olympics
Athletes (track and field) at the 1984 Summer Olympics
Ivorian male sprinters
Olympic athletes of Ivory Coast
Place of birth missing (living people)
Universiade medalists for Ivory Coast
Universiade medalists in athletics (track and field)